The League Cup is a football cup competition in Thailand. It is also known as Toyota League Cup for sponsorship reasons.

It was re-formed during the 2010 domestic football league season in Thailand and runs along the same lines as the Thai FA Cup except that the earlier rounds would be regional rather than an open draw.

Final

Format
Thai League Cup is open to all members of the Football Association of Thailand and Thai League 1 and is divided into eight rounds; the remaining Thai League teams enter at the first round. Matches in all rounds are single-legged, except for the semi-finals, which have been two-legged since the competition began. In single-legged top division teams will plays as away team. The semi-finals were the exception to this, which the away goals rule and penalties were introduced.

For finals match that has finished level after extra time has been decided by a penalty shoot-out. The winner also qualifies for Mekong Club Championship until 2017 but from season 2020 the winner will qualify for ASEAN Club Championship.

Sponsorship
From 2010 to the present, the League Cup has attracted title sponsorship, the League Cup was named after its sponsor, giving it the following names:

References

External links
Official Website

 
2
National association football cups
Recurring sporting events established in 2010
2010 establishments in Thailand